2006 World Junior Championships may refer to:

 Athletics: 2006 World Junior Championships in Athletics
 Figure skating: 2006 World Junior Figure Skating Championships
 Ice hockey: 2006 World Junior Ice Hockey Championships
 Motorcycle speedway:
 2006 Individual Speedway Junior World Championship
 2006 Team Speedway Junior World Championship

See also
 2006 World Cup (disambiguation)
 2006 Continental Championships (disambiguation)
 2006 World Championships (disambiguation)